Sir Wolstan Dixie of Appleby Magna and then Market Bosworth (1576 – 25 July 1650) was the founder of the Dixie Grammar School in Market Bosworth.

He was born the son of John Dixie, a yeoman farmer of Catworth, Huntingdonshire and educated at Gray's Inn from 1595. In 1594 he inherited an estate at Market Bosworth from his great-uncle the first Sir Wolstan Dixie, Lord Mayor of London, who had endowed the Dixie Professor of Ecclesiastical History at Cambridge University.

He was knighted by James I of England in 1604 as Sir Wolstan Dixie of Appleby Magna. In 1608 he moved to Market Bosworth and commenced work on the original manor house and a grammar school. 

In 1614 he was appointed High Sheriff of Leicestershire and in 1625 the county's representative in Parliament.

He died in 1650. He had married Frances, the daughter of Sir Thomas Beaumont of Stoughton Grange, Leicestershire with whom he had 4 sons and 4 daughters. 

His son, the then elderly Sir Wolstan Dixie, 1st Baronet, was also appointed High Sheriff of Leicestershire for 1660 and created the first of a line of the Dixie baronets by Charles II of England when the King returned from exile in France.

References

1576 births
1650 deaths
People from Market Bosworth
Members of Gray's Inn
16th-century English people
Members of the Parliament of England for Leicestershire
English knights
English MPs 1625
High Sheriffs of Leicestershire
Knights Bachelor